The National Competitiveness Council (NCC) is a public-private body that develops strategy for the long-term competitiveness of the Philippines through policy reforms, project implementation, institution building, and performance monitoring. 

Its mission is to build up the long-term competitiveness of the country through policy reforms, implementation of strategic projects, institution building, and performance monitoring.

Composition
 Secretary of the Department of Trade and Industry as Chairperson
 Private Sector Representative as Co-Chairperson
 Secretary of the Department of Finance as member
 Secretary of the Department of Energy as member
 Secretary of the Department of Tourism as member
 Secretary of the Department of Education as member
 Director General if the National Economic and Development Authority as member
 Five Private Sector Representatives as member
 Secretariat

The Private Sector Co-Chairperson is appointed by the President for a term of 2 years and is eligible to be re-appointed for 1 additional term. The five private sector representatives shall likewise be appointed by the President with a term of 2 years.

The Executive Director of the Department of Trade and Industry - Center for Industrial Competitiveness serves as the NCC Secretariat. The ED is assisted by a nominee from the private sector staff who serves as the Operations Director.

Working Groups
 Agri-Trade Logistics 
 Anti-Corruption
 Anti-Smugglong  
 Budget Transparency 
 Business Permits and Licensing System 
 Education and Human Resources Development 
 ICT Governance 
 Transport, Infrastructure, Trade and Logistics (formerly Infrastructure)
 Judicial System 
 National Quality Infrastructure 
 Inter-Agency Business Process Interoperability (formerly National Single Window) 
 Performance Governance System 
 Power and Energy Services

Ease of Doing Business Initiative | Gameplan for Competitiveness
NCC sends updates on the Ease of Doing Business reforms to the IFC to be considered for the next release of the DB Report. Each update contains the description and impact of the reform together with its date of entry into force and legal basis when applicable, and the relevant documents necessary to validate these reforms.

Cities and Municipalities Competitiveness Index
This year, the Municipalities Competitiveness Index covered 1120 lgus- a significant increase as compared to its first run back in 2013 with only 268 lgus. To recognize the most competitive cities and municipalities, the National Competitiveness Council holds its annual Regional Competitiveness Summit. The summit brings together delegates composed of Local Chief Executives, representatives from the LGUs, and delegates from National Government Agencies, the Academe, and the Private Sector.

Economic dynamism
It is associated with activities that create stable expansion of business and industries and higher employment. This is the concrete representation of productivity as it matches the output of the local economy with local resources.

 Size of the Local Economy (as measured through business registrations, capital, revenue, and permits)
 Growth of the Local Economy (as measured through business registrations, capital, revenue, and permits)
 Capacity to Generate Employment
 Cost of Living
 Cost of Doing Business
 Financial Deepening
 Productivity
 Presence of Business and Professional Organizations

Government efficiency
This refers to the quality and reliability of government services and government support for effective and sustainable productive expansion.
 Capacity of Health Services
 Capacity of Schools
 Security
 Business Registration Efficiency
 Compliance to Business Permits & Licensing System (BPLS) standards
 Presence of Investment Promotions Unit
 Compliance to National Directives for Local Government Units (LGU)
 Ratio of LGU collected tax to LGU revenues
 Social Protection

The Department of the Interior and Local Government used to measure the local government's score on transparency and economic governance through the Local Governance Performance Management System (LGPMS).

Infrastructure
It refers to the physical building blocks that connect, expand, and sustain a locality and its surroundings to enable the provision of goods and services. It involves basic inputs of production such as energy, water; interconnection of production such as transportation, roads, and communications; sustenance of production such as waste, disaster preparedness, environmental sustainability and human capital formation infrastructure.

 Existing Road Network
 Distance from City/Municipality Center to Major Ports
 Department of Tourism-Accredited Accommodations
 Availability of Basic Utilities
 Annual Investments in Infrastructure
 Connection of Information and Communications Technologies
 Number of Public Transportation Vehicles
 Health Infrastructure
 Education Infrastructure
 Number of Automated Teller Machines

Resiliency 
It refers to the capacity of a locality to facilitate businesses and industries to create jobs, raise productivity, and increase the incomes of citizens over time despite of the shocks and stresses it encounters. This implies that the role of local governments is critical in ensuring a competitive environment to make businesses sustain their profits, create jobs, and increase the productivity of its people. In order for localities to be able to do this, it must be resilient in its infrastructure, governance, social and environmental systems.

 Organization and Coordination: Land Use Plan
 Organization and Coordination: Disaster Risk Reduction Plan
 Organization and Coordination: Annual Disaster Drill
 Organization and Coordination: Early Warning System
 Resiliency Financing: Budget for DRRMP
 Resiliency Reports: Local Risk Assessments
 Resiliency Infrastructure: Emergency Infrastructure
 Resiliency Infrastructure: Utilities
 Resilience of System: Employed Population
 Resilience of System: Sanitary System

Partial ranking (2019)

Province

Annual Enterprise Survey on Corruption
The Annual Enterprise Survey on Corruption has provided a unique snapshot of the Filipino business sector’s perspectives on corruption and good governance.  By pointing out critical areas for reform, and encouraging private and public sector participation in the fight against corruption, the survey proved to have a powerful impact on the conduct of business and economic growth in the Philippines and proved to be an important tool in raising consciousness about the costs of corruption, in advocating for critical reforms, and in measuring the effectiveness of counter-corruption efforts. The survey results have also served as one of the key indicators used by development organizations, academic institutions, government agencies, and civil society in measuring progress in the fight against corruption.

The Enterprise Survey’s data also help the Filipino public track trends on perceptions of corruption, on attitudes of business people towards corruption, their rating of the sincerity of government agencies in fighting corruption, and the business practices of the private sector in dealing with government agencies.  The survey is administered through face-to-face interviews with managers of businesses throughout the country where their responses are based on personal experience.

BPLS Field Monitoring and Evaluation Survey
Commissioned by the National Competitiveness Council through the regional and provincial offices of the Department of Trade and Industry and a partner local academe, and as a part of the Good Governance and Anti-Corruption Cluster initiatives, the Field Monitoring and Evaluation Survey aims to determine the compliance rate of the selected local government units in terms of the BPLS standards set for both new and renewal process. The survey also intends to ensure the implementation of the nationwide streamlining of BPLS program through performance and customer feedback. The survey is conducted by a local academe through: interviews, focused group discussions, and through secondary resources (articles, circulars, city ordinances, etc.). Based on the list of lgus provided by the DILG-LGA, a sample size of at least 20 respondents per LGU was determined in the conduct of the survey.

BPLS Customer Experience Survey
The National Competitiveness Council, in partnership with the Department of Trade and Industry’s Regional and Provincial offices launched the conduct of the Customer Experience Survey. The survey is conducted annually during the renewal period of business permits from January to February. The survey aims to: assess the experience of businessmen who renewed their mayor’s permit in the renewal period of January to February; to determine the satisfaction level of businessmen based on the customer satisfaction index framework with the process of renewing their mayor’s permit in their respective lgus.

See also
 Philippine Competition Act

External links
 National Competitiveness Council
 Cities and Municipalities Competitiveness Index
  Administrative Order No. 38, creating the Inter-agency Task Force on Ease of Doing Business
  Philippines Business Registry (PBR)

References 

Department of Trade and Industry (Philippines)
Organizations established in 2006
Organizations based in Metro Manila
Think tanks based in the Philippines
2006 establishments in the Philippines